Cognitivism may refer to:
 Cognitivism (ethics), the philosophical view that ethical sentences express propositions and are capable of being true or false
 Cognitivism (psychology), a psychological approach that argues that mental function can be understood as the internal manipulation of symbols
 Cognitivism (aesthetics), a view that cognitive psychology can help understand art and the response to it
 Anecdotal cognitivism, a psychological methodology for interpreting animal behavior in terms of mental states

See also
 Cognition, the study of the human mind
 Cognitive anthropology
 Cognitive science
 Computationalism
 Philosophy of mind
 Situated cognition
 Socio-cognitive
 Symbol grounding